Paul E. Beaudoin (born 1960 in Hialeah, Florida) is an American composer, theorist and author.  His 60-second piano piece "dance re: pnmr" has been on a worldwide tour with pianist Guy Livingston and was recorded by him for the Wergo label.

Biography
Dr. Beaudoin received his education from the University of Miami in Coral Gables, FL (BM, 1983); the New England Conservatory of Music in Boston, MA (MM with Academic Distinction, 1987) and a Ph.D. in Music Composition and Theory from Brandeis University in 2002. He has worked with Martin Boykan, Robert Cogan, Michael Finnissy, and Dennis Kam.

He has authored a chapter on American Jazz and another on American popular music that appears in Connect for Education's OnMusic of the World (McGraw-Hill) (Fall, 2007).  He teamed with Judith Tick on the Oxford University Press book Music of the U.S.A.: A Documentary Companion (Oct., 2008) and he is a widely respected reviewer of music texts published by Prentice Hall, Bedford/St. Martins, W. W. Norton, and McGraw Hill.  In 2009, his online "History of Jazz" received an Innovative Teaching award from the Center for Teaching and Learning at Fitchburg State College in Fitchburg, MA.  Dr. Beaudoin continues to develop online courses in music and art that are recognized internationally.

He has been a composers' fellow at the MacDowell Colony (1995; 1997), the Wellesley Composer's Conference (1997); the Festival at Sandpoint, June in Buffalo (Buffalo, New York), and was an American composer-in-residence at the Royal Opera House Garden Venture in Dartington, England. As a theorist he has given papers on the music of Milton Babbitt (New England Conference of Music Theorists, 1994), György Ligeti (McGill Theory Conference, 2000) and has twice participated in the Orpheus Academy for Music Theory in Ghent, Belgium.

Dr. Beaudoin has taught music theory, music history, music composition and clarinet at Northeastern University, the New England Conservatory of Music, the Boston Conservatory of Music and online courses in Music History and Jazz at Somerset Community College in Somerset, Kentucky.  In 1996 he received the coveted Brandeis Prize Instructorship and in 2003, the prestigious Excellence in Teaching Award from Northeastern University.  He is currently Assistant Professor of Humanities at Fitchburg State University and a lecturer at Rhode Island College in Providence, Rhode Island.

Online Education Specialist
With the creation of his online History of Jazz course written in 2008, Dr. Beaudoin has been an active participant in the online learning environment.  Two of his courses have received prestigious recognition:  "from Woodstock to the iPod: A Social History of American Popular Music" received the Massachusetts Colleges Online "Course of Distinction" award.  His innovative "Commonwealth of the Arts" course for Fitchburg State University was a recipient of the 2013 Exemplary Course Award given by Blackboard Inc.  Dr. Beaudoin is also a frequent international keynote and workshop leader.  In 2014, Dr. Beaudoin was inducted into the prestigious Blackboard, Inc. MVP team.

Dr. Beaudoin is a dynamic leader, speaker, and advocate for online education.  His practical, creative and innovative strategies help educators engage, motivate and retain students.   He has spoken at several conferences, symposia and workshops on eLearning and is published in The Chronicle for Higher Education, Campus Technology, 21st century Classroom and others.

In 2009, Dr. Beaudoin was invited to deliver a paper entitled "iTunes, YouTube and Me: Integrating Music Technology in the Music Classroom" at the 2nd Conference on the Changing Face of Music Education in Tallinn, Estonia. That paper was subsequently translated into Hungarian and published in the journal Parlando.  In April 2012, Dr. Beaudoin delivered the opening Keynote Address titled "What if?" at the Changing Face of Music and Art Education in Tallinn, Estonia.  That address was partially translated into Estonian and subsequently broadcast on ClassicRadio One throughout the Baltic region.

In 2013, Dr. Beaudoin presented at the eLearning in Action conference at the Sharjah Higher Colleges of Technology in the U.A.E.  He was also a workshop leader at the Rhode Island Music Educators Conference and Blackboard World 2013 where he addressed issues of motivating online students. In 2014 he returned to the Music Department at the Institute of Fine Arts at Tallinn University in Estonia to deliver a keynote address entitled "The Puzzle Box."

Beginning in January 2015, Dr. Beaudoin will be a Fulbright Scholar in residence at Tallinn University.  Dr. Beaudoin's writings can be seen online at Academia.edu.

Recordings

re: dance (PNMR).  Recorded by Guy Livingston on "Don’t Panic: 60 Seconds for piano."  Wergo 66492.lamentus (for robert cogan and pozzi escot). available on CeC, Montreal, Canada.

References

American male composers
21st-century American composers
American musicologists
Brandeis University alumni
Living people
People from Hialeah, Florida
University of Miami alumni
New England Conservatory alumni
1960 births